Kokarje is a village on the right bank of the Dreta River in the Municipality of Nazarje in Slovenia. The area belongs to the traditional region of Styria and is now included in the Savinja Statistical Region.

The local church, built on a slight elevation south of the settlement, is dedicated to the Virgin Mary and belongs to the Parish of Rečica ob Savinji. It was first mentioned in written documents dating to 1453, but the building was extensively rebuilt in the 17th and 19th centuries.

References

External links
Kokarje on Geopedia

Populated places in the Municipality of Nazarje